Kên Higelin (born 11 February 1972) is a French stage and film actor, theatre director and music video director.

After having worked at a young age with theatre director Peter Brook, most notably in La Tempête, a French adaptation of Shakespeare. He is best known for his music videos for Mathieu Boogaerts and Brigitte Fontaine. He has also played lead role of Fausto Barbarico in the 1993 film Fausto depicted as a young fashion designer.

Personal life
He is the son of French singer Jacques Higelin and of Kuelan Nguyen, and half brother of singers Arthur H and Izïa Higelin. He is of Vietnamese descent through his mother.

Theatre
1985: Mahâbhârata, directed by Peter Brook (Festival d'Avignon)
1991: La Tempête of William Shakespeare, directed by Peter Brook, (Théâtre des Bouffes du Nord and Festival d'Avignon)
1995: L'Histoire tragique de la vie et de la mort du Dr Faustus of Christopher Marlowe, directed by Stuart Seide, (Théâtre de la Ville)

Filmography
films
1993: Fausto as Fausto Barbarico (lead role)

TV series
1989: The Mahabharata as deathless boy (TV mini-series)
1995: Police des polices (TV series - 1 episode - "Vidéo preuves")

shorts
1993: Total!
1994: Une femme dans l'ennui
1998: Il suffirait d'un pont

References

External links 
 

1972 births
Living people
French film directors
French male stage actors
French male film actors
French people of Vietnamese descent
French people of Belgian descent